Thapana Sirivadhanabhakdi (born 1975) is a Thai businessman and the CEO and president of ThaiBev since 2008.

Early life
He is the third of five children of the Thai Chinese billionaire Charoen Sirivadhanabhakdi (Su Xuming), the founder and chairman of ThaiBev. His Chinese family name is Su, and "Sirivadhanabhakdi" is the Thai surname granted by King Bhumibol of Thailand to his father in 1988.

Thapana earned a bachelor's degree in finance and a master's degree in financial economics, both from Boston University.

Career
In January 2008, Thapana was appointed as the CEO and president of ThaiBev, having served five years as a director and executive vice president of the company.

Thapana has management roles or directorships in Berli Jucker, Beer Thai, Red Bull Distillery Group, Dhospaak, Oishi Group, Oishi Group Public Co Ltd, Univentures PLC, Siam Food Products PLC, and the Southeast Group of Companies.

Personal life
Thapana is married to the former Papatchya Thienprasiddhi. She is the daughter of Pracha and Prajittra Thienprasiddhi. She manages the family-owned Thienprasiddhi Kindergarten.

References

1970s births
Living people
Thapana Sirivadhanabhakdi
Boston University School of Management alumni
Thapana